Lighvan is a sour, hole filled brined curd cheese traditionally made from sheep's milk in Liqvan, a village in East Azerbaijan, Iran.

Processing 
Lighvan cheese, one of the most popular Iranian traditional cheeses, is a starter-free cheese from the Azerbaijan region, in the north-west of Iran, and manufactured from raw ewe's milk. It ripens in 10 to 12% salt brine for 3 or 4 months at an average temperature of 10 ± 2 °C. In spite of the increasing popularity of Lighvan cheese, there are few studies on its chemical composition and microbial communities
The milk is coagulated with rennet tablets, then the curd is packed into triangular cloth bags and is allowed to drain thoroughly. Then they are covered with salt, and are left for two days.

Cooking and eating 
The cheese is usually served for breakfast or dinner with fresh bread.

Similar cheeses around the world 
Similar cheeses can be found in: 
 Albania ( or )
 Bulgaria  (сирене, sirene)
 Egypt (domiati); Sudan (gibna beyda)
 Finland (salaattijuusto, salad cheese)
 Georgia (ყველი, kveli, lit. cheese)
 Greece (Feta)
 Israel (gvina bulgarit, lit. Bulgarian cheese)
 Lebanon (lit. Bulgarian cheese)
 North Macedonia (бело сирење, belo sirenje, lit. white cheese)
 Poland (bryndza)
 Romania (brânză telemea)
 Russia (брынза, brynza)
 Serbia (сир, sir)
 Turkey (beyaz peynir, lit. white cheese)
 Ukraine (бринза, brynza)

See also

Notes

External links
 village website
Cheese in Iran

Sheep's-milk cheeses
Brined cheeses
Iranian cuisine
Azerbaijani cuisine